The Brock Yates' One Lap of America is an annual motorsports event in the United States that has been held since 1984. It is the successor to the Cannonball Baker Sea-To-Shining-Sea Memorial Trophy Dash, an underground auto race of the 1970s.

The original premise for both was to drive cross-country, but One Lap of America now respects speed limits, and has become a set of time trials at racetracks around the country, with overnight road trips between tracks. A minimum of two drivers are required. Cars must be street-legal and run one set of street tires the entire event.

Both events are the creation of automotive journalist Brock Yates. One Lap of America is currently sponsored by Tire Rack and organized by Brock Yates, Jr.

History 
Competition occurs as time trials held at various race tracks around the country. The competitors drive from track to track overnight, without the benefit of support crews. The field is divided into several classes based primarily on original manufacturers suggested retail prices and number of doors. Competitors may make any modifications to their vehicles as they see fit but must run on a single set of tires, typically provided by the race sponsor, throughout the entire event, and vehicles must remain street legal with the modifications. Race track events are time trials with up to eight cars on track at a time. Competition is for fastest time rather than wheel-to-wheel racing.

The first One Lap in 1984 circumnavigated the lower forty-eight United States with the scoring based on comparing the entrants' declared mileage with that of the organizer's ("guess Brock's mileage"). From 1985 through 1991 competition was a series of road rallies: time-speed-distance events conducted on public roads.

The One Lap of America has attracted such famous drivers as Parnelli Jones, Price Cobb, Brian Makse, John Buffum, Elliott Forbes-Robinson, and Hurley Haywood.  It is sanctioned by the National Auto Sport Association and since 2013 benefits the Alzheimer's Association, as founder Brock Yates suffered from the disease for nearly 12 years until his death in 2016.

Previous Winners

References

External links
 http://www.onelapofamerica.com/

Auto races in the United States